Kobilja is a  river in Central  Bosnia, between Skender Vakuf and  Imljani.  It is a right bank tributary of the Ugar River.

Kobilja occurs from several sources-bald head, of which the most is Srebrenik (1,010 m), which rises on the south-eastern slopes samenamed  elevation (Srebrenik, 1,131 m), from the massive mountain languages (1,276 m). Band around the top of the extremely rich strong sources of drinking water, of which begin streams basins of Ugar  and Vrbanja rivers. From the Djevojačka ravan (Girls' Plane, above Dunići rocks and Demićka river) to Vakufske Njive (Vaqf Fields)  there are over 50 streams.  Srebrenik is known locally and tanzitno resting place.

Among the many smaller tributaries, the most important right stream is Vukovica, and left are: Strašivi  potok, and Zlovarski  potok (streams).

Watershed  of the two basins extends along local roads Skender Vakuf - Turbe - Travnik (via Ilomska, Korićani and Vitovlje). All Ugar's streams flow into Kobilja, and Vrbanja's in Demićka, Grabovička river,  and Duboka.

Whole flow of Kobilja is in the municipality of Skender Vakuf. During 1960th, at Kobilji and its tributaries, there were 20 mills.

See also 
Ilomska
Pljačkovac
Imljani
Skender-Vakuf

References 

Rivers of Bosnia and Herzegovina